Lovely Liza  is a 1997 Dutch film directed by Maria Peters.

Cast
Gonny Gaakeer	... 	Liza
Ingrid Desmet	... 	Petra
Esther Leenders	... 	Daphne
Stijn Westenend	... 	Joost
Marije Idema	... 	Sanne
Vincent Moes	... 	Rik
Ineke Veenhoven	... 	Kantinejuf
Susan Visser	... 	Nora
Mike Reus	... 	Monteur
Stefan Sasse	... 	Radio DJ (voice)

External links 
 

Dutch drama films
1997 films
1990s Dutch-language films